Borisovsky District is an administrative district (raion), one of the twenty-one in Belgorod Oblast, Russia. As a municipal division, it is incorporated as Borisovsky Municipal District. It is located in the west of the oblast. Its administrative center is the urban locality (a settlement) of Borisovka. Population:   26,282 (2002 Census);  The population of Borisovka accounts for 52.5% of the district's total population.

Geography
Borisovsky District sits southwestern region of Belgorod Oblast, on the border with Ukraine. It is bordered on the south by Bohodukhiv Raion, Kharkiv Oblast of Ukraine, on the west by Grayvoronsky District, on the north by Rakityansky District, and on the east by Yakovlevsky District and Belgorodsky District. The administrative center of the district is the town of Borisovka, Belgorod Oblast.

The major river through the district is the Vorskla River, which flows east to west through the district, with grey soils to the north of the river and black earth soils to the south of the river. The forest of the Vorskla River is partially protected by Belogorye Nature Reserve.

References

Sources

Districts of Belgorod Oblast